Sanfins is a former civil parish in the municipality of Santa Maria da Feira, Portugal. In 2013, the parish merged into the new parish Santa Maria da Feira, Travanca, Sanfins e Espargo. It has a population of 1,970 inhabitants and a total area of 3.70 km2. Its postal code is 4520.

The parish was first mentioned in 1288.  The parish of Sanfins including its other parishes of the municipality lies in the Vouga Valley.

Sites of interests
Mala-Posta de Sanfins Building, Mala-Posta de São Jorge Building or Souto Redondo

References

Former parishes of Santa Maria da Feira